Andrey Vladimirovich Malay (born 13 March 1973) is a Russian professional football coach and a former player.

Club career
He made his professional debut in the Russian Second Division in 1992 for FC Baltika Kaliningrad.

Honours
 Russian Premier League bronze: 2000.

European club competitions
With FC Torpedo Moscow.

 UEFA Cup 2000–01: 1 game.
 UEFA Cup 2001–02: 2 games.

References

1973 births
People from Zelenodolsk
Living people
Russian footballers
Association football defenders
Russian Premier League players
Russian football managers
FC Baltika Kaliningrad players
FC Torpedo Moscow players
FC Torpedo-2 players
FC Saturn Ramenskoye players
FC Akhmat Grozny players
FC Sodovik Sterlitamak players
FC Ufa managers